Saint Mary's High School (Rajkot) is one of the oldest primary and secondary schools in Rajkot, Gujarat, India. It has a  campus located on the Kalavad Road of Rajkot city.

History
St. Mary's School opened on 11 August 1957 with 25 students. Fr. E. Gadea, the parish priest of Rajkot, was the founder and first principal. The classes were conducted in the premises of the Catholic Church at Mochi bazaar. The school was granted official recognition by the government of Saurashtra on 11 June 1959. Fr. Mateo Ramonell took charge as principal in June 1961, and in the same year Gujarati was introduced as an additional medium of instruction.

In 1961, Fr. Ramonell bought the present property on Kalawad Road, 5 km from the city, and the foundation stone of a new building was laid in January, 1962. The next June the school moved into the new building but it took another five years for the construction to be completed. In 1968, the first batch of 46 students sat the SSC Board examinations. Fr. Azcotia was the principal from 1970 to 1977.

In 1977, the management of the school was transferred from the Society of Jesus to the Carmelites of Mary Immaculate. Fr. John Naduvathussery was the first CMI principal of the school in 1977. In the same year, the higher secondary section was opened, the English language being used as the medium for instruction for both the science and general streams. Fr. John Naduvathussery started a separate building for primary education in 1978. This was completed by Fr. Mathew Bassus in 1983 and had an open-air stage. An auditorium and the first floor of the primary school were built by Fr. Joseph Madhuravely in 1998.

https://www.facebook.com/groups/smsalumnirajkot/

Vision

https://www.facebook.com/groups/smsalumnirajkot/

Affiliated associations
 All India Association of Catholic Schools.
 AINACS (Rajkot Unit) – 53 schools in Saurashtra-Kutch region.
 Common syllabus and examinations.

Past principals
Rev. Fr. E. Gadea SJ (1957–1960)
Rev. Bro. Harry Rodrigues (1960–1961)
Rev. Fr. Mateo Ramonell SJ (1961–1970)
Rev. Fr. Azcotia SJ (1970–1977)
Rev. Fr. John Maduvathussery CMI (1977–1979)
Rev. Fr. Mathew Basus CMI (1979–1988)
Rev. Fr. John Kodamkandam CMI (1987–1988)
Rev. Fr. Jose George CMI (1988–1989)
Rev. Fr. Joseph Madhuravely (1989–1999)
Rev. Fr. Cyriac Kannezath CMI (1999–2001)
Rev. Fr. Thomas Kolamkuzhiyil (2001–2005)
Rev. Fr. Davis Manjaly  CMI (2005–2011)
Rev. Fr. Wilson Matthew (2011 – 2016)
Rev. Fr. Johnson CMI (2016 - Present)

Notable alumni
Tulsi Tanti- Founder at SUZLON Group of Companies
Karan G Saxena- Director Sai Generators PVT. Ltd.
Author of Tinkling Quotes Book, First Book Published across 180+ Countries

References

External links
Official website
Alumni Facebook page

Education in Rajkot
High schools and secondary schools in Gujarat
Christian schools in Gujarat